The 2016 season is the final time BBCU in the Thai Premier League since 2012.

Players

Current squad

Thai Premier League
Toyota Thai Premier League

Thai FA Cup
Chang FA Cup

Thai League Cup
Toyota League Cup

External links
 BBCU Official Website
 BBCU Official Facebook
 Thaileague Official Website 

Thai football clubs 2016 season
Association football in Thailand lists